Charles Lyman "Poss" Parsons (born May 3, 1892) was an American college football player and coach. He served as the Colorado School of Mines in 1916 and Colorado College from 1919 to 1921.

References

External links
 Sports-Reference profile

1892 births
Year of death missing
Basketball coaches from Iowa
Iowa Hawkeyes football players
Colorado College Tigers football coaches
Colorado College Tigers men's basketball coaches
Colorado Mines Orediggers football coaches
Players of American football from Iowa
Sportspeople from Iowa City, Iowa